Taoyuan Air Base was a Republic of China Air Force base located in Taoyuan, Taiwan, southeast of Taipei's civilian Taoyuan International Airport. In 2007, the site was turned over to the Republic of China Navy and was renamed to Taoyuan Naval Base.

History
The United States Air Force's 44th Fighter-Bomber Squadron operating the F-86 Sabre was deployed here from 27 January to 17 February 1955 and again from 3–30 September 1955.

In 1957 two RB-57A reconnaissance aircraft of the 6021st Reconnaissance Squadron were based here to take part in project Heartthrob missions over the People's Republic of China and these were later replaced by RB-57Ds operated as part of project Diamond Lil.

On 10 September 1958, as part of the U.S. response to the 1958 Quemoy Crisis, disassembled F-104A Starfighters of the 83rd Fighter-Interceptor Squadron were airlifted by C-124s to Taoyuan where they were reassembled as part of Operation Jonah Able. The first F-104A was operational 30 hours after arriving and by 19 September the entire squadron was operational. On December 6th 1958 the men of the 83rd FIS were relieved by the men of the 337th Fighter-Interceptor Squadron under the command of Col. James Jabara and in March 1959 the F-104s were again disassembled and loaded aboard C-124s for return to the 83rd FIS at McClellan Air Force Base.

The Black Cat Squadron flying U-2 surveillance aircraft was based here from 1961 to 1974. The 5th/401st Tactical Combined Wing operating F-104 Starfighters and later F-5s was also based here.

In November 1965 Li Xianbin, a defecting Chinese pilot, landed his IL-28/H-5 bomber here against the wishes of his navigator Li Caiwang and tail gunner Lian Baosheng. Lian committed suicide upon landing in Taiwan.

In 2014, after the Chung Cheng Aviation Museum was closed to make way for construction at Taoyuan International Airport, the 18 aircraft displayed there were moved to Taoyuan Naval Base.

References

Defunct airports in Taiwan
Airports in Taiwan
Republic of China Air Force
Military installations of the Republic of China
Installations of the United States Air Force in Taiwan